"(Tonight We Just Might) Fall in Love Again" is a song co-written and recorded by American country music artist Hal Ketchum. It was released in April 1994 as the first single from the album Every Little Word.  The song reached No. 20 on the U.S. Billboard Hot Country Singles & Tracks chart.  It was written by Ketchum and Al Anderson.

Music video
The music video was directed by Sherman Halsey and premiered in May 1994.

Chart performance
"(Tonight We Just Might) Fall in Love Again" debuted at number 66 on the U.S. Billboard Hot Country Singles & Tracks for the week of April 23, 1994.

References

1994 singles
Hal Ketchum songs
Songs written by Al Anderson (NRBQ)
Songs written by Hal Ketchum
Song recordings produced by Allen Reynolds
Curb Records singles
1994 songs